In current military use, combined operations are operations conducted by forces of two or more allied nations acting together for the accomplishment of a common strategy, a strategic and operational and sometimes tactical cooperation. Interaction between units and formations of the land, naval and air forces, or the cooperation between military and civilian authorities in peacekeeping or disaster relief operations is known as joint operations or interoperability capability.

Conceptual development

Pre-modern history

The concept of combined operations evolved largely as a result of expeditionary warfare that can be traced to the Sea Peoples. In its basic form it involved raiding coastal regions by land forces arriving from the naval vessels. The raiding tactics were expanded into more complex operations by Alexander the Great, who used naval vessels for both troop transporting and logistics in his campaigns. The next exponents of combined operations in the ancient world of the Mediterranean Basin were the Carthaginians who introduced two entirely new dimensions to the use of naval forces by staging not only operations that combined naval and land troops, but also eventuated in combining strategic multi-national forces during the land phase of the operation when Hannibal in his most famous achievement at the outbreak of the Second Punic War marched an army that included war elephants, from Iberia over the Pyrenees and the Alps into northern Italy. Following the example of Carthage, the Romans used combined operations extensively to expand their Empire and influence in the Mediterranean and beyond, including the Roman conquest of Britain, which was not only a temporary expeditionary operation but included long term occupation and Roman settlement of the territories. Following the peace agreement between Kush and Rome in 21 BC, the Kushites and Romans performed joint military operations against several adversaries.

The next development of combined operations came from environmental pressures in the Scandinavian region during the Middle Ages, and the emergence of the Viking migrations that combined raiding, longer term inland operations, occupation and settlement. These operations were conducted as sea, coastal, and riverine operations, and sometimes were strategic in nature, reaching as far as Constantinople.

In Southeast Asia, the development of combined operations proceeded along the same developmental path as in Europe with the raids by the Wokou, or so-called "Japanese pirates". Because the Wokou were weakly resisted by the Ming Dynasty, the raiding eventually developed into fully fledged expeditionary warfare with the Japanese invasions of Korea (1592–1598).

The development in combined operations reached a new level during the Crusades, when the element of political alliance was introduced as an influence on the military strategy, for example in the Sixth Crusade.

Although all combined operations until the invention of the combustion engine were largely dependent on the sailing vessels, it was with the creation of sophisticated rigging systems of the European Renaissance that the Age of Sail allowed a significant expansion in the scale of combined operations, notably by the European colonial empires. Some have argued that this was the first revolution in military affairs that changed national strategies, operational methods and tactics both at sea and on the land. One notable example of this evolution was the French Invasion of Egypt (1798).

Modern history

Though a significantly expanded combined operation, the Crimean War was the first example of a planned combined operations campaign that was directed as part of a multinational coalition strategy. Aside from being the first modern expeditionary operation that used steam powered warships and telegraph communications—which made it the departing point for the rest of the 19th and 20th century developments—it was also the first used as a military theatre instrument to force decision in the conflict.

The next development in the evolution of combined operations was made during the expansion of the European Empires and the era of colonialism that also led to the inclusion of the combined operations methods into the direct expression of national strategies to avoid full-scale conflicts in the shape of the gunboat diplomacy approach. It was at this time that naval troops previously used almost exclusively for defence of vessels or minor beach operations were expanded to enable extended littoral operations. The colonial experience, though largely confined to the period before World War I, persisted well into the 20th century.

The period of World War I that prolonged well past its completion into the 1920s saw combined operations established as a systematic and planned operations with larger scope then simple transportations of troops, and the beginnings of development in true combined operations at strategic, operational and tactical levels with the unsuccessful amphibious landing at Gallipoli. Not only did this operation combine the elements of overall war planning context, multinational deployment of forces as part of the same operation, and use of troops prepared for the landings (as opposed to disembarkation), as well as naval gunfire support that was only limited during the era of sailing ships, but also included extensive use of combat engineering in support of the infantry.

One of the most extensive and complex of combined operations that followed the war was the Allied intervention in the Russian Civil War that saw forces deployed in the Baltic region, the Arctic region, along the Black Sea coast and in the Russian Far East, which for the first time saw the use of aircraft used in cooperation with the naval and land components of the deployed forces.

The phrase "combined operations" was first introduced by the British War Office in World War II to denote multi-service activities, those that involved air, land or naval forces acting together, and coordinated by the Combined Operations Headquarters.

Given U.S. usage of the word 'joint' meaning such activities, the British usage faded relatively quickly. After World War II, the United States Department of Defense began using the term to denote multi-national operations, which might mean land forces of several countries, for example Combined Forces Land Component Command, or 'Combined Joint,' multi-national, multi-service activities and operations.

The term Combined Joint Task Force then took on an extra meaning, beyond that of a multi-national, multi-service grouping, when it came to refer to a particular type of NATO deployment planning, outside the NATO Treaty area, in the late 1990s.

Since the early 1980s the concept of combined operations had been referred to by NATO and in particular by the United States Department of Defence as joint operations. Regardless of the use of combined, joined or interoperability terms the concept is used to ensure that different military organisations maintain the ability to conduct combat and non-combat military operations regardless of the national and service (ground, naval and air forces) differences.

The ability to conduct combined operations allows national forces, their subordinated formations, units or systems to perform tasks and complete missions and operations together. The overriding requirement is that they share common doctrine and procedures, utilise each other's infrastructure and bases, and to be able to communicate with each other. These abilities reduce duplication of effort and increase economies of scale in a strategic alliance of its members, allow pooling of resources, and produces synergies among its commands.

In the NATO concept, interoperability does not necessarily require common military equipment. What is important is that this equipment can share common facilities and is able to communicate with other equipment. NATO militaries claim to have achieved interoperability because of decades of joint planning, training and exercises during the Cold War.

See also
 Joint warfare

References

Sources
 Combined Operations Command dedication site http://www.combinedops.com/index.htm
 Williams, Darryl A. Maj., Facilitating Joint Operations: The Evolving Battlefield Coordination Element., School of Advanced Military Studies Monographs, Command and General Staff College (CGSC), 	Fort Leavenworth, KS : US Army Command and General Staff College, 1996

Further reading
 Symonds, Craig L., ed. Union Combined Operations in the Civil War  (Fordham University Press, 2010) 240 pages. Scholarly studies of the thrusts up the York and James rivers during the Peninsular campaign.

External sources
 Joint Operations (RN, Army, RAF, NATO) 
 NATO Joint Warfare Centre, Stavanger, Norway 

Military doctrines